The 2018–19 Louisiana–Monroe Warhawks men's basketball team represents the University of Louisiana at Monroe in the 2018–19 NCAA Division I men's basketball season. The Warhawks, led by ninth-year head coach Keith Richard, play their home games at Fant–Ewing Coliseum as members of the Sun Belt Conference.

Previous season
The Warhawks finished the 2017–18 season 16–16, 9–9 in Sun Belt play to finish in a tie for fifth place. They defeated Arkansas State in the first round of the Sun Belt tournament before losing in the quarterfinals to Georgia Southern. They received an invitation to the CollegeInsider.com Tournament where they lost in the first round to Austin Peay.

Roster

Schedule and results

|-
!colspan=9 style=| Non-conference regular season

|-
!colspan=9 style=| Sun Belt Conference regular season

|-
!colspan=9 style=|Sun Belt tournament

|-
!colspan=12 style=|CollegeInsider.com Postseason tournament
|-

References

Louisiana–Monroe Warhawks men's basketball seasons
Louisiana-Monroe
Louisiana-Monroe
Louisiana-Monroe
Louisiana-Monroe